Gen. John F. Reynolds School is a historic school building located in the North Central neighborhood of Philadelphia, Pennsylvania. It was designed by Irwin T. Catharine and built in 1925–1926. It is a four-story, 12-bay by 3-bay, brick building on a raised basement in the Art Deco-style. It has a one-story addition on the eastern side built in 1958. It features an entrance with Doric order columns and decorative terra cotta panels.  It was named for Civil War General John F. Reynolds (1820–1863).

It was added to the National Register of Historic Places in 1988. The school was closed in 2013 and sold to the Philadelphia Housing Authority in 2014.

References

School buildings on the National Register of Historic Places in Philadelphia
Art Deco architecture in Pennsylvania
School buildings completed in 1926
North Central, Philadelphia
Defunct schools in Pennsylvania
1926 establishments in Pennsylvania